Read Bridge (Chinese: 李德桥) is a beam-structured bridge located at Clarke Quay within the Singapore River Planning Area in Singapore. The bridge crosses the Singapore River linking Clarke Quay to Swissôtel Merchant Court. The bridge was built in 1881, completed in 1889 and opened on 18 April 1889. The bridge is opened to pedestrians and bicycles, and has been modified several times.

History
On 3 November 2008, the  bridge was selected for conservation as part of the Urban Redevelopment Authority's expanded conservation programme.

References

Victor R Savage, Brenda S A Yeoh (2004), Toponymics - A Study of Singapore Street Names, Eastern University Press,

External links

National Library Board on Read Bridge

Singapore River
Bridges in Singapore
Bridges completed in 1889
19th-century architecture in Singapore